This list is of the Cultural Properties of Japan designated in the category of  for the Urban Prefecture of Ōsaka.

National Cultural Properties
As of 1 February 2015, one Important Cultural Property has been designated, being of national significance.

Prefectural Cultural Properties
As of 1 May 2014, five properties have been designated at a prefectural level.

See also
 Cultural Properties of Japan
 List of National Treasures of Japan (historical materials)
 List of Historic Sites of Japan (Ōsaka)
 Kawachi, Izumi, and Settsu Provinces

References

External links
  Cultural Properties in Ōsaka Prefecture

Cultural Properties,historical materials
Historical materials,Osaka